The 2008 Louisville Cardinals football team represented the University of Louisville in the 2008 NCAA Division I FBS football season. The team, led by Steve Kragthorpe in his second year at the school, played their home games in Papa John's Cardinal Stadium and were in their fourth year as members of the Big East Conference.

Schedule

References

Louisville
Louisville Cardinals football seasons
Louisville Cardinals football